Bonchurch Manor  is a manor house on the Isle of Wight, situated in Bonchurch.

History
Bonchurch was held before the Conquest as an alod by Estan of Earl Godwin. In 1086 it belonged to William son of Azor, and was of considerable worth, doubtless owing to the grazing value of its chalk downs. Sir John Oglander gives the following fanciful account of its early history: 'The church was erected in the reign of William the Conqueror by John de Argenton, a Frenchman, to whom William Fitz Osbern gave Bonchurch. Argenton "got it to be made a parish by means of his brother's son Walkelin, then Bishop of Winton." ' The Argenteins, however, do not seem to have held any land in the Isle of Wight until the end of the 12th century.  It was one of the manors held by John de Lisle at the end of the 13th century of the honour of Carisbrooke Castle, and it followed the same descent as West Court in Shorwell (q.v.) to the Popham and Hill families. The part held by the Hills passed to Rosa daughter of Lieut.-Col. Charles Fitz Maurice Hill, who married the Rev. James White. The Bonchurch estate, belonging to Mrs. Rosa White, was put up for sale in 1836 and passed to different owners.  In 1863 the manorial rights were purchased by Dr. Leeson, but none are now exercised. Bonchurch Manor is currently owned by Christopher Rose, an attorney, and his wife Khadine.

References

This article includes text incorporated from William Page's "A History of the County of Hampshire: Volume 5 (1912)", a publication now in the public domain

Country houses on the Isle of Wight
Manor houses in England